Shifeng Bridge is a cable-stayed bridge on Beijing's western 5th Ring Road. It is near Wanping, near the Marco Polo Bridge.

Nearly 1.4 kilometres in length, it is a trademark bridge of the 5th Ring Road.

Under the bridge runs many railways to other parts of China.

The bridge is so named because it crosses from Shijingshan District into Fengtai District.

Shifeng Bridge is well illuminated at night.

Cable-stayed bridges in China
Bridges in Beijing
Road bridges in China